Lucy Fischer (born 1945) is an American film studies scholar currently Distinguished Professor at University of Pittsburgh.

In 2001-03 Fisher was a President of the Society for Cinema and Media Studies.

Selected works

References

University of Pittsburgh faculty
Film educators
1945 births
Living people
American women non-fiction writers
American women academics
21st-century American women
Presidents of the Society for Cinema and Media Studies